Eve MacDonald is a classicist and archaeologist who specialises in social history. She is a Lecturer in Ancient History at Cardiff University. MacDonald previously worked at the Universities of Edinburgh and Reading. In 2015 she published Hannibal: A Hellenistic Life with Yale University Press.

Education 
MacDonald completed a degree in classics at the University of Alberta. For post-graduate study, MacDonald completed a Master of Arts at UCL Institute of Archaeology and then a Doctor of Philosophy at the University of Ottawa.

Career 
MacDonald worked as a teaching fellow at the University of Edinburgh between 2007 and 2011, and then the University of Reading from 2012 to 2017. While at the University of Reading, MacDonald published a biography of Hannibal, Hannibal: A Hellenistic Life with Yale University Press. The book presented Hannibal as part of Hellenistic culture. In a review published in The Classical Review, John R. Holton described MacDonald's book as "an excellent achievement, arguably the best of its kind to date". Writing in The Heythrop Journal, Patrick Madigan echoed these sentiments, calling it "the most complete life of Hannibal to date". MacDonald's expertise on Hannibal led her to appear in documentaries on Hannibal for PBS and Channel 4.

MacDonald joined Cardiff University in 2017 where she is a lecturer in ancient history.

Selected publications

References

External links 

 Cardiff University faculty page
 
 

Classics educators
Classical scholars
Women classical scholars
Academics of the University of Reading
Academics of the University of Edinburgh
Academics of Cardiff University
Alumni of the UCL Institute of Archaeology
University of Ottawa alumni
University of Alberta alumni
Living people
Year of birth missing (living people)